Popbot is the name of an award-winning prestige format comic book written and illustrated by Australian, Ashley Wood.

In 2004 IDW, in association with Sideshow Toys, produced the extremely popular limited edition Popbot polystone statue designed by Ashley Wood.

Movie
In September 2006 Ashley Wood announced in his blog that a Popbot movie had been announced. Resolution Independent have acquired the rights to make a Popbot movie, Wood's company 7174 will be providing the art direction with Wood having a close involvement.

Awards
 Communication Arts 2002 Award of Excellence for Illustration
 2 Spectrum Gold Awards for "Excellence in Advertising" and "Comics", in 2002 ("Comics" award was for the comic "Luwona angry", which is also from Popbot)

References

 Ashley Wood official website
 Ashley Wood info at IDW Publishing (original link no longer working)

External links
 Ashley Wood official website

2004 comics debuts
IDW Publishing titles